The Jordan Village Historic District in Jordan, New York is a  historic district that dates back to 1810.  It was listed on the National Register of Historic Places in 1983 and includes 70 contributing buildings, 1 contributing site, and 2 contributing structures.

References

Historic districts on the National Register of Historic Places in New York (state)
Historic districts in Onondaga County, New York
National Register of Historic Places in Onondaga County, New York